Cnaemidophorus urbicella is a moth of the family Pterophoridae. It is found in Russia (Tatarstan).

References

Moths described in 2002
Endemic fauna of Russia
Platyptiliini